Vincent James Dowling was an Australian explorer and pastoralist.

He was born in Sydney in 1835, and educated for a short while in Ashfield, and then in England. His early experiences on the land included droving sheep and cattle from the New England district (where he held a run for about 3 years) to the markets in Victoria. In 1859 he established a station at Fort Bourke (now known as Bourke) on the Darling River, starting with 1200 Hereford cattle. A year later he became a Justice of the Peace in NSW (Mudgee, Bourke, Sofala and Bathurst) then Queensland. Around this time, Dowling began exploring in south west Queensland, tracing the Paroo and the Bulloo Rivers to their sources, and in 1861, established Caiwarroo and Eulo stations. These were followed by more stations on the Cuttaburra and Warrego, and Birrawarra and Yantabulla in NSW. In a partnership with George Cox, with himself as the active manager, they leased over 3367 square kilometres of land in the Warrego district. These stations were stocked with Hereford cattle, which Dowling considered superior to the more common Shorthorn breed.

Vincent Dowling is also credited with establishing a pastoral lease called Thargomindah, and this was to become the town of Thargomindah, which he sold in 1874. At the time of its sale, Thargomindah covered a massive 129 km of Bulloo River frontage and 2590 square km of mulga ridges and salt bush plains.

Dowling married Frances Emily Breillat in Sydney in 1877. They raised four sons and three daughters. One of the daughters, Ruth (who married to become Ruth Fairfax) later becoming known for establishing the Australian Country Women's Association. His wife returned to western Queensland with him, and was possibly the first white woman to live in this region.

By 1875, the partnership of Dowling and Cox had finished in Queensland and Dowling moved to Rylstone, where he established a merino stud, along with breeding Hereford cattle and horses. In 1880 he purchased Gummin Gumin in the Warrumbungles, and in the same year Walla Walla, near Gilgandra, Connemara (near Cooper Creek in Queensland) and Pillicawarrina on the Macquarie River near Quambone. From the 1890s to the end of his life, the economics of the time, and drought, saw his finances take a beating, along with complicated court costs over selections on Pillacawarrina.

During his life, Dowling was involved in many high level societies and associations. He was a member of the Bathurst Anglican Synod, vice president of the Royal Agricultural Society of NSW, the Australian Jockey Club and the Stockowners Association, as well as councillor for the Tax Payers Union. He died in 1903 and is buried at the Mudgee Anglican cemetery.

References

External links 

 
 
 

1835 births
1903 deaths
Australian explorers
Australian pastoralists
19th-century Australian businesspeople